Edwin Lani Hanchett (November 2, 1919 - August 11, 1975) was and American prelate who served as Bishop of Hawaii from 1969 to 1975.

Education and early life
Hanchett was born in Honolulu on November 2, 1919 to Alsoberry Kaumu Hanchett and Mary McGuire. His father was first doctor of Hawaiian ancestry to practice in the islands. He graduated from 'Iolani School in 1931 and was a graduate of the Church Divinity School of the Pacific and the University of Hawaii. On June 21, 1941, he married Puanani Akana, and together had four children. He was awarded a Doctor of Divinity from Church Divinity School of the Pacific in 1969.

Priesthood
He was ordained deacon on July 20, 1952 and priest on September 19, 1953 by Bishop Harry S. Kennedy of Hawaii. He then became vicar of the Church of the Holy Innocents in Lahaina, Hawaii, while in 1959 he transferred to St George's Church in Honolulu to serve as its vicar.  Between 1960 and 1967, he served as rector St Peter's Church in Honolulu.

Episcopacy
On September 26, 1967, Hanchett was elected Suffragan Bishop of Hawaii and was consecrated on  December 30, 1967. Two years later, on October 24, 1969, he was elected on the first ballot as diocesan bishop, the first person of Hawaiian ancestry to lead the Episcopal Church there. He was installed in St. Andrew's Cathedral on January 18, 1970. Bishop Hanchett had represented Province VIII on the national Executive Council of the Episcopal Church since 1973. He died of cancer in St. Francis Hospital, Honolulu on August 11, 1975.

Personal life
Hanchett married Puanani Akana on June 21, 1941 and had four children.

References

External links 
Bishop Hanchett of Hawaii Dies

1919 births
1975 deaths
University of Hawaiʻi at Mānoa alumni
Episcopal bishops of Hawaii
Church Divinity School of the Pacific alumni
20th-century American Episcopalians
20th-century American clergy